Dino Dan is a Canadian television series that was created and directed by J. J. Johnson. The series premiered on TVOKids in Canada on January 4, 2010 and on Nickelodeon's Nick Jr. in the United States on October 17, 2010. A third season of the series, Dino Dana, has been aired on TVOKids in Canada and instead of being aired on Nick Jr. in the United States it is streamed on Amazon.com.

Series overview

Episodes

Season 1

Season 2

Season 3 (Dino Dan: Trek's Adventures)

Season 4 (Dino Dan: Trek's Adventures)

Season 5 (Dino Dana)

Season 6 (Dino Dana)

Season 7 (Dino Dana)

Season 8 (Dino Dana)

References

Lists of Canadian children's television series episodes